Reformation is a peer-reviewed academic journal sponsored by the Tyndale Society, publishing "original research in scholarship of the Reformation era". Founded by D.J. Daniell in 1996, the journal is published biannually by Taylor & Francis on behalf of the Tyndale Society.

The current editor is Mark Rankin, Associate Professor of English at James Madison University.

The Tyndale Society 

The Tyndale Society was inaugurated in 1995, one year before the first issue of Reformation was published. The aims of the Society are "to promote a greater knowledge and understanding of the importance of the contribution made by William Tyndale to the English Reformation by his Biblical translations and theological writings, and to encourage relevant research and study". The Society pursues these purposes mainly through publications and events.

External links 
 

Protestant studies journals
Publications established in 1996
English-language journals
Biannual journals